The Last Waltz is the second live album by the Band, released on Warner Bros. Records in 1978, catalogue 3WS 3146. It is the soundtrack to the 1978 film of the same name, and the final album by the original configuration of the Band. It peaked at No. 16 on the Billboard 200.

Contents
The triple album documents the Band's "farewell" concert which took place at Bill Graham's Winterland Ballroom on Thanksgiving Day 1976. The event included an actual Thanksgiving dinner for 5,000 attendees, with ballroom dancing and a stage set for La traviata borrowed from the San Francisco Opera.

The concert featured songs by the Band interspersed with the group backing up a variety of musical guests. These included many with whom they had worked in the past, notably their previous employers Ronnie Hawkins and Bob Dylan. Van Morrison, a Woodstock neighbor, had co-written and sung on the track "4% Pantomime" for the Cahoots album. Individual members of the Band had played with the invitees on the following albums: in 1972 with Bobby Charles for his self-titled album; in 1973 with Ringo Starr on Ringo; in 1974 with Joni Mitchell on Court and Spark and with Neil Young on On the Beach and the sessions for Homegrown, later assembled into an album and released in 2020; in 1975 with Muddy Waters and Paul Butterfield on The Muddy Waters Woodstock Album; in 1976 with Eric Clapton on No Reason to Cry and with Neil Diamond on Beautiful Noise.

Sides one through five of the album consisted of songs taken from the concert. Side six comprised "The Last Waltz Suite", new numbers composed by Robertson and performed by the Band on an MGM soundstage. The suite featured Emmylou Harris and, on a remake of "The Weight", Roebuck and Mavis Staples. The music received overdubs at Village Recorders and Shangri-La studios in post-production, owing to faults recorded during the concert.

On April 16, 2002, a box set reissue of the album arrived in stores, including everything released on the original with additional tracks taken from the concert.

Track listing
The performance of "Helpless" by Neil Young features backing vocals by Joni Mitchell; Paul Butterfield plays harmonica for Muddy Waters on "Mannish Boy"; Dr. John plays congas on "Coyote" and plays guitar on "Down South in New Orleans"; the entire ensemble sings back-up on the closer, "I Shall Be Released".

Personnel
The Band
 Rick Danko – bass guitar, fiddle, vocals
 Levon Helm – drums, mandolin, vocals
 Garth Hudson – organ, piano, accordion, synthesizer, clavinet, saxophones
 Richard Manuel – piano, drums, organ, clavinet, Dobro, vocals
 Robbie Robertson – guitars, piano, vocals

The horn section
 Rich Cooper – trumpet, flugelhorn
 James Gordon – flute, tenor saxophone, clarinet
 Jerry Hey – trumpet, flugelhorn
 Howard Johnson – tuba, baritone saxophone, flugelhorn, bass clarinet
 Charlie Keagle – clarinet; flute; alto, tenor and soprano saxophones
 Tom Malone – trombone, euphonium, alto flute, bass trombone
 Larry Packer – electric violin
 Horns arranged by Henry Glover, Garth Hudson, Howard Johnson, Tom Malone, John Simon and Allen Toussaint

Guest personnel

 Paul Butterfield – harmonica, vocal
 Bobby Charles – vocal
 Eric Clapton – guitar, vocal
 Neil Diamond – guitar, vocal
 Dr. John – piano, guitar, congas, vocal
 Bob Dylan – guitar, vocal
 Emmylou Harris – guitar, vocal
 Ronnie Hawkins – vocal
 Bob Margolin – guitar on "Mannish Boy"
 Joni Mitchell – guitar, vocal
 Van Morrison – vocal

 Pinetop Perkins – piano on "Mannish Boy"
 Dennis St. John – drums on "Dry Your Eyes"
 John Simon – piano on "Too Ra Loo Ra Loo Ral"
 Cleotha Staples – harmony vocal on "The Weight"
 Mavis Staples – vocal
 Roebuck "Pops" Staples – guitar, vocal
 Yvonne Staples – harmony vocal on "The Weight"
 Ringo Starr – drums on "I Shall Be Released"
 Muddy Waters – vocals
 Ronnie Wood – guitar on "I Shall Be Released"
 Neil Young – guitar, harmonica, vocal

Production personnel
 Robbie Robertson – producer
 John Simon - producer, string arrangements 
 Rob Fraboni – producer
 Ed Anderson – recording and mixing engineer
 Terry Becker, Neil Brody, Tim Kramer, Elliot Mazer and Wayne Neuendorf – recording engineers
 Baker Bigsby, Tony Bustos and Jeremy Zatkin – mixing engineers
Bill Graham – concert production

Charts

Weekly charts

Year-end charts

2002 box set

The Last Waltz is a 2002 four-disc box set re-release of the 1978 album The Last Waltz documenting the concert The Last Waltz, the last concert by the Band with its classic line up. A full forty tracks are taken from the show in addition to rehearsal outtakes. Twenty-four tracks are previously unreleased.

Among the tracks added are a version of Louis Jordan's "Caldonia" featuring Muddy Waters and Pinetop Perkins trading off the vocal, a reworked version of "Rag Mama Rag", Neil Young and Joni Mitchell joining the Band on "Acadian Driftwood", "The W.S. Walcott Medicine Show", excerpts from a pair of instrumental jams involving several of the concert's guest performers, and the concert closer "Don't Do It". In addition, several edits made on the original 1978 set have been done away with; certain songs (such as "Forever Young" with Bob Dylan) are now presented in their unedited versions.

Songs still missing from the concert are a version of "Georgia on My Mind", the full versions of the two jams presented, the full version of "Chest Fever", and the concert takes of "King Harvest (Has Surely Come)" and "Evangeline". While the album still has overdubbing, re-sequencing, and editing, it does give a more accurate representation of the event itself than the earlier album or film do, according to collectors who have made comparisons with bootleg recordings of the concert.

On November 11, 2016, this set was reissued as part of a 40th Anniversary edition that includes the 1978 Scorsese film on a separate Blu-ray disc. Enclosed in a 10" by 11.5" booklet, the set contains numerous photographs from the event as well as essays by David Fricke and Ben Fong-Torres. A previously published article entitled "A Behind-the-Scenes Report" by Emmett Grogan is also included, as well as a reproduction of the article on the event by Joel Selvin printed in the San Francisco Chronicle on November 27, 1976. It is not indicated whether or not new mastering was done to the audio discs over and above that from the 2002 reissue.

Box set track listing
All songs were written by Robbie Robertson, except where noted.

Box set personnel
The Band
Rick Danko – bass, fiddle, vocals
Levon Helm – drums, mandolin, vocals
Garth Hudson – organ, piano, accordion, synthesizers, clavinet, horns
Richard Manuel – piano, drums, organ, clavinet, dobro, vocals
Robbie Robertson – guitars, piano, vocals

Horns
Rich Cooper – trumpet, flugelhorn
James Gordon – flute, tenor saxophone, clarinet
Jerry Hey – trumpet, flugelhorn
Howard Johnson – tuba, baritone saxophone, flugelhorn, bass clarinet
Charlie Keagle – clarinet, flute, alto, tenor and soprano saxophones
Tom Malone – trombone, euphonium, alto flute, bass trombone
Larry Packer – electric violin
Horns arranged by Henry Glover, Garth Hudson, Howard Johnson, Tom Malone, John Simon and Allen Toussaint

Guests

Paul Butterfield – harmonica, vocals
Bobby Charles – vocals
Eric Clapton – guitar, vocals
Neil Diamond – guitar, vocals
Dr. John – piano, guitar, congas, vocals
Bob Dylan – guitar, vocals
Emmylou Harris – guitar, vocals studio portion
Ronnie Hawkins – vocals
Bob Margolin – guitar
Joni Mitchell – guitar, vocals
Van Morrison – vocals
Pinetop Perkins – piano, vocals

Carl Radle – bass
Dennis St. John – drums
John Simon – piano
Cleotha Staples – harmony vocal studio portion
Mavis Staples – vocals studio portion
Roebuck "Pops" Staples – guitar, vocals studio portion
Yvonne Staples – harmony vocal studio portion
Ringo Starr – drums
Stephen Stills – guitar
Muddy Waters – vocals
Ronnie Wood – guitar
Neil Young – guitar, harmonica, vocals

Technical personnel
Robbie Robertson – producer
John Simon and Rob Fraboni – co-producers
Ed Anderson – recording and mixing engineer
Terry Becker, Neil Brody, Tim Kramer, Elliot Mazer and Wayne Neuendorf – recording engineers
Baker Bigsby, Tony Bustos and Jeremy Zatkin – mixing engineers
Bill Graham – concert production
John Simon – string arrangements

References

1978 live albums
1978 soundtrack albums
Collaborative albums
Concert film soundtracks
The Band live albums
Warner Records live albums
Warner Records soundtracks